Salehabad (also Romanized as Şāleḩābād; also known as Sālābād) is a village in Chahdegal Rural District, Negin Kavir District, Fahraj County, Kerman Province, Iran. At the 2006 census, its population was 78, in 18 families.

References 

Populated places in Fahraj County